Booklist is a publication of the American Library Association that provides critical reviews of books and audiovisual materials for all ages. Booklists primary audience consists of libraries, educators, and booksellers. The magazine is available to subscribers in print and online. Booklist is published 22 times per year, and reviews over 7,500 titles annually. The Booklist brand also offers a blog, various newsletters, and monthly webinars.  The Booklist offices are located in the American Library Association headquarters in Chicago’s Gold Coast neighborhood.

History
Booklist, as an introduction from the American Library Association publishing board notes, began publication in January 1905 to "meet an evident need by issuing a current buying list of recent books with brief notes designed to assist librarians in selection."

With an annual subscription fee of 50 cents, Booklist was initially subsidized by a $100,000 grant from the Carnegie Foundation, known for its public and university library endowments, and at first mainly contained the briefest 25- to 50-word summaries. In 1913, the Booklist offices were moved from Boston to the ALA headquarters in Chicago's McCormick mansion. By the 1930s the reviews had become more in-depth, and the journal began to include some articles. In October 1939, just a few weeks after the start of World War II, Booklist published an article entitled "Books for the 'Long and Calm View': On the Crisis, Its Background and Implications to the United States", intended to address "the demand for impartial books without the emotionalism of propaganda." Amidst a world crisis, the editor helped library patrons to have their questions answered while presenting various viewpoints. From the 1950s to the 1960s, Booklist reviews were limited to 150 words, generally three long sentences. Reviews were handwritten in pencil on yellow legal paper, edited and typed up for the printer. Artistic design choices for the magazine were minimal, with the only visual change between issues being the plain cover's solid colour.

The 1970s saw a great deal of change in the Booklist offices. As adolescent literature gained popularity, a Young Adult books editor was hired. The publication of such books as Judy Blume’s Forever, Phyllis Reynolds Naylor's Alice series, and S.E. Hinton's The Outsiders marked a need to evaluate books not meant strictly for either children or adults. In 1973, new editor-publisher Paul Brawley was the first to print editions of the magazine with recreated book jackets on the cover. Some Booklist subscribers protested the flashy new covers, supposedly claiming they liked the plain covers and the space they afforded for listing potential book orders. Under Brawley’s editorship, beginning with 16mm film strips and spoken-word recordings, Booklist began to accept submissions and print reviews of audiovisual products. During the 1980s and 1990s, Booklist began its Editors’ Choice reviews and its first feature column, “Manley Arts”, by Will Manley. The 1990s issues of Booklist were the first to be composed on in-office computers.

The June 2005 issue of Booklist marked the magazine’s 100th anniversary. To celebrate the centennial, the acting editors published a feature article entitled “The Booklist Century”, wherein they chose a book from each year of the preceding hundred to highlight its social impact — ranging from Edith Wharton's The House of Mirth (1905) to the 9/11 Commission Report.

Currently, the magazine can be found online and in print. The Booklist editorial team also creates supplemental products, such as Book Links, webinars and the Booklist Reader. Booklist offices are located in the 50 E. Huron building at the ALA headquarters.

Current masthead
 George Kendall- Editor & Publisher
 Donna Seaman - Editor, Adult Books
 Sarah Hunter - Editor, Books for Youth
 Susan Maguire - Senior Editor, Collection Management and Library Outreach
 Heather Booth - Editor, Audio

Reviews and reviewers
Booklist Reviews Booklist reviews are said to be "the haiku of book reviewing." Reviews include a brief synopsis, plus mention of the most successful elements of style. Most reviews fall between 175 and 225 words.Starred Reviews The Booklist star indicates an outstanding title of a particular genre. All starred reviews are approved by the appropriate editor.High-Demand Booklist recognizes that libraries wish to purchase new materials as soon as they become available, and therefore works to review titles as early as possible. The “High-Demand Backstory” symbol indicates titles likely to be surrounded by media coverage and patron popularity.Adult Books with YA Appeal As an additional source for librarians, Booklist reviews certain adult titles and labels them for YA appeal. These materials tend to have young protagonists or themes relevant to teenage readers.Recommendation-only system Since its founding in 1905, Booklist has followed a recommendation-only system. This means that every title reviewed would make a quality addition to library collections.Booklist Selection Policy The editors of Booklist magazine adhere to a selection policy consistent with the Library Bill of Rights. The process of choosing titles for reviews aims to promote readership, never censorship.Booklist Reviewers Titles are reviewed by a corps of librarians, freelancers, journalists, and educators, as well as Booklist editors and staff.

Other productsWebsite Booklist Online is the website and archive of the Booklist print magazine. Within the database, subscribers have access to digital editions of the print magazine, an archive of over 170,000 reviews, and a host of feature content. Non-subscribers can read a Review of the Day and sign up for free monthly webinars. Booklist Online was developed in 2005, concurrent with the magazine’s centennial, and launched in early 2006.Blog Launched in September 2014, The Booklist Reader is updated daily with feature content for both librarians and recreational readers. Articles often link to reviews found on Booklist Online.Book Links A quarterly supplement to Booklist that is free to Booklist subscribers, Book Links magazine helps educators and youth librarians design topical literature-based curriculum. Book Links provides thematic bibliographies with related discussion questions and activities, author and illustrator interviews and essays, and articles written by educators on practical ways to turn children on to reading. Each issue includes specific suggestions for tying Common Core State Standards to books featured in the publication. Published in September, November, January, and April, each Book Links issue focuses on a different core curriculum area, including social studies, multicultural literature, language arts, and science. Book Links articles from October 2009 onward are available to Booklist subscribers on Booklist Online.

Webinars Booklist hosts 3-5 webinars per month with varying subject matter. Booklist webinars address such topics as curriculum design, how to increase reading rates, seasonal features, and publishing previews sponsored by various publishing houses and imprints. Anyone can sign up for a Booklist webinar, regardless of whether or not they subscribe to the publication.

Newsletters Booklist publishes a variety of monthly, bimonthly and quarterly newsletters, all of which are delivered in electronic form via e-mail.
 REaD ALERT provides links to a chosen few reviews from the current issue of Booklist.
 Booklist Online Exclusives offers links to the set of reviews and feature articles that are published exclusively on Booklist Online.
 Booklandia offers links to popular YA reviews and feature content that highlights trends in the YA genre.
 Quick Tips for Schools & Libraries provides discussion questions and activities for librarians and educators working to connect children with literature.
 Corner Shelf provides content that addresses Readers’ Advisory and Collection Development, aimed at helping librarians find common ground between the two.
 Booklist Online Video Review is an overview of the most highly recommended video and audiovisual titles.
 Bookmakers is a periodic e-newsletter that focuses on the history of a single publishing house.

Sponsored awards

The American Library Association sponsors and juries many annual literary awards, such as the Newbery Medal, the Caldecott Medal, and the Alex Award. Booklist itself sponsors three main awards: the Michael L. Printz Award for Excellence in Young Adult Literature, the Andrew Carnegie Medals for Excellence in Fiction and Nonfiction, and the Odyssey Award for Excellence in Audiobook Production.

The Printz Award is administered by the Young Adult Library Services Association. The Carnegie Medals are administered by an annually appointed selection committee, including a chair, three Booklist editors or contributors, and three former members of the RUSA CODES Notable Books Council. The Odyssey Award is jointly administered by the Association for Library Service to Children and the Young Adult Library Services Association.

Additionally, Booklist selects Editors’ Choice lists for adult books, young adult books, books for youth, adult audiobooks, and audiobooks for youth. The best title in each category is selected to a list known as Top of The List. Editors' Choice and Top of the List titles are announced in December and printed in the subsequent January 1 & 15 double issue of Booklist.

See also
 Book Links
List of literary magazines
 Books in the United States

References

External links
Booklist magazine (updated; current official webpage)
Booklist Online
 Hathi Trust. Booklist, 1905—

1905 establishments in Illinois
Bimonthly magazines published in the United States
American Library Association
Literary magazines published in the United States
American book websites
Book review magazines
Library science magazines
Magazines established in 1905
Magazines published in Chicago